FC Olimpik Kropyvnytskyi is an amateur football club based in Kropyvnytskyi, Ukraine. Before 2015 it was known as FC Olimpik Kirovohrad. The club regularly participates in the Kirovohrad Oblast Football Championship. In 2007–08 it played at the Ukrainian Second League.

History
Olimpik Kropyvnytskyi entered the profession ranks in 2007 competing in the Druha Liha B. Their games were played at Zirka Stadium which used to be the property of the once famous club FC Zirka Kropyvnytskyi. The president and the head coach is Yuriy Kevlich.

On July 16, 2008, the club made swap with FC Zirka Kropyvnytskyi and continued on the amateur level.

League and cup history

{|class="wikitable"
|-bgcolor="#efefef"
! Season
! Div.
! Pos.
! Pl.
! W
! D
! L
! GS
! GA
! P
!Domestic Cup
!colspan=2|Other
!Notes
|-
|align=center|2007
|align=center|4th
|align=center|4
|align=center|6
|align=center|1
|align=center|0
|align=center|5
|align=center|3
|align=center|22
|align=center|3
|align=center|
|align=center|
|align=center|
|align=center|
|-
|align=center|2007–08
|align=center|3rd "B"
|align=center|17
|align=center|34
|align=center|6
|align=center|7
|align=center|21
|align=center|33
|align=center|66
|align=center|25
|align=center|1/64 finals
|align=center|
|align=center|
|align=center|
|-
|align=center|2008
|align=center colspan=9|refer to FC Zirka Kirovohrad
|
|UAC
|1st Qual Round
|
|-
|align=center|2009
|align=center|4th
|align=center|4
|align=center|6
|align=center|0
|align=center|0
|align=center|6
|align=center|3
|align=center|15
|align=center|0
|align=center|
|align=center|UAC
|align=center|1st Qual Round
|align=center|
|-
|align=center|2010
|align=center|4th
|align=center|5
|align=center|8
|align=center|2
|align=center|0
|align=center|6
|align=center|7
|align=center|21
|align=center|6
|align=center|
|align=center|UAC
|align=center|1st Qual Round
|align=center|
|-
|align=center|2011
|align=center|4th
|align=center|6
|align=center|10
|align=center|0
|align=center|3
|align=center|7
|align=center|3
|align=center|22
|align=center|3
|align=center|
|align=center|UAC
|align=center|1st Qual Round
|align=center|
|-
|align=center|2012
|align=center|4th
|align=center|5
|align=center|3
|align=center|0
|align=center|0
|align=center|3
|align=center|1
|align=center|10
|align=center|0
|align=center|
|align=center|
|align=center|
|align=center|withdrew, annulled
|-
|align=center|2013
|align=center colspan=13|regional competitions
|-
|align=center|2014
|align=center|4th
|align=center|4
|align=center|6
|align=center|0
|align=center|0
|align=center|6
|align=center|4
|align=center|29
|align=center|0
|align=center|
|align=center|
|align=center|
|align=center|
|-
|colspan=14 align=center| 2015–17 in regional competitions
|-
|align=center|2017–18
|align=center|4th
|align=center|9
|align=center|16
|align=center|0
|align=center|2
|align=center|14
|align=center|11
|align=center|81
|align=center|2
|align=center|
|align=center|
|align=center|
|align=center|
|-
|align=center|2018–19
|align=center|4th
|align=center|11
|align=center|13
|align=center|1
|align=center|1
|align=center|11
|align=center|9
|align=center|52
|align=center|4
|align=center|
|align=center|
|align=center|
|align=center|
|}

Notable players
 Ihor Zahalskyi
 Oleksandr Kochura
 Yevhen Konoplyanka (youth)

See also
FC Zirka Kropyvnytskyi
Kirovohrad Oblast Football Federation

References

External links
  Official club website 
 Artur Valerko and Artem Tsyhanenko. Olympique de Kropyvnytsky. What do nine Africans do in the team of the Konoplyanka's first coach (Olympique de Kropyvnytsky. Что делают девять африканцев в команде первого тренера Коноплянки). Sport Arena. 13 March 2019.

 
Sport in Kropyvnytskyi
Amateur football clubs in Ukraine
Football clubs in Kirovohrad Oblast
2000 establishments in Ukraine
Association football clubs established in 2000